Martin Bugge Urianstad (born 6 February 1999) is a Norwegian professional road cyclist, who currently rides for UCI ProTeam .

Major results
2019
 1st  Mountains classification, Grand Prix Priessnitz spa
2020
 1st  Road race, National Under-23 Road Championships
2022
 1st  Active rider classification, Saudi Tour

References

External links

1999 births
Living people
Norwegian male cyclists
Sportspeople from Stavanger